Mehrdad Kafshgari (born 22 April 1987) is an Iranian football midfielder  who played for Nassaji in the Persian Gulf Pro League.

Career

Rah Ahan
He joined to Rah Ahan in summer 2011. He played two seasons for Rah Ahan in the IPL and played 42 games and scored one time.

Persepolis
He signed a three-year contract with Persepolis on 26 May 2013 and was used as midfielder. He scored his first goal for Persepolis in a 6–0 away victory over Mes Kerman.

Club career statistics

Honours
Persepolis
Iran Pro League runner-up: 2013–14, 2015–16

References

External links 
Mehrdad Kafshgari at PersianLeague.com
Mehrdad Kafshgari at ffiri.ir

1987 births
Living people
Rah Ahan players
Persepolis F.C. players
Iran under-20 international footballers
Iranian footballers
People from Qaem Shahr
Association football midfielders
Nassaji Mazandaran players
Sportspeople from Mazandaran province